Halvergate is a village and civil parish in the English county of Norfolk, north of Reedham, between the Rivers Bure and Yare, within The Broads. To the east of the village is the hamlet of Wickhampton and the Halvergate Marshes, an area of drainage marsh which was the site of the first Environmentally Sensitive Area in the United Kingdom in 1987.

The villages name origin is uncertain possibly, 'land costing half a heriot'.

For the purposes of local government, it falls within the district of Broadland. The civil parish includes the village of Tunstall.

The long distance footpath named the Weavers' Way passes through Halvergate, and this provides one of the few modes of access to Berney Arms.

The village has a cricket team that plays in the East Anglian Premier League.

See also
 Stracey Arms Windpump in Tunstall.
 Mutton's Mill in Halvergate Marshes.

Notes 

http://kepn.nottingham.ac.uk/map/place/Norfolk/Halvergate

External links

Broadland
Villages in Norfolk
Civil parishes in Norfolk